Roslin may refer to:

Scotland
Roslin, Midlothian (sometimes spelt Rosslyn or Roslyn), a village in Midlothian, south of Edinburgh, Scotland
Rosslyn Chapel
Roslin Castle
Roslin Institute, where Dolly the Sheep was cloned
Battle of Roslin, 1303 
Barony of Roslin

United States
Roslin House, the Spanish House of Haverford College
Roslin Art Gallery

People
Alexander Roslin (1718–1793), Swedish painter
Gaby Roslin (born 1964), British television presenter
Helisaeus Roeslin (1544–1616), German physician, astrologer and astronomer, 1544–1616
Toros Roslin, 13th-century Armenian Byzantine-style manuscript illuminator (active 1256–1268)

Characters
Laura Roslin, a main character from Battlestar Galactica
Roslin Frey (also written as 'Roslyn'), a minor character from A Song of Ice and Fire

See also
 Roslyn (disambiguation)
 Rosslyn (disambiguation)